Man Crazy is a 1953 American film noir drama film directed by Irving Lerner and starring Neville Brand, Christine White, Irene Anders, Colleen Miller and John Brown.

Plot
Three women come to Hollywood to break into the movies.

Cast
 Neville Brand as Paul Wocynski
 Christine White as Georgia Daniels
 Irene Anders as Millie Pickett
 Colleen Miller as Judy Bassett
 John Brown as Dr. Duncan
 Joe Turkel as Ray
 Karen Steele as Marge
 Jack Larson as Bob
 William Lundmark as Steve (as Bill Lundmark)
 John Crawford as Farmer
 Ottola Nesmith as Mrs. Becker
 Charles Victor as Mechanic
 Frances Osborne as Customer

See also
 List of American films of 1953

References

External links
 
 
 

1953 films
American drama films
1953 drama films
American black-and-white films
1950s English-language films
1950s American films